Basavaraju Saraiah  is an Indian politician from Telangana. He served as Minister for backward castes welfare in the Kiran Kumar Reddy led AP State Cabinet and MLA of Warangal East with Congress party. He joined Telangana Rastra Samithi on 23 February 2016.

References

Telangana politicians
Telangana Rashtra Samithi politicians
Living people
1955 births